Georgi Asparuhov Rangelov (4 May 1943 – 30 June 1971), nicknamed Gundi, was a Bulgarian footballer who played as a striker.

A prolific forward of his generation, Asparuhov was renowned for his finishing, technique and heading ability. He was voted the best Bulgarian footballer of the 20th century and Europe's 40th best player of the century, a position shared with Paolo Rossi. Asparuhov was also nominated for the 1965 Ballon d'Or award, finishing eighth in the final standings.

In international football, Asparuhov made his Bulgaria debut on 6 May 1962 at the age of 19. He made 49 appearances in total, appearing at three FIFA World Cup tournaments, in 1962, 1966 and 1970, and scoring 18 goals.

Asparuhov's career was cut short in 1971 at the age of 28 when he died in a vehicle accident. Levski Sofia's stadium is named in his honour.

Career

Beginnings at Levski
Asparuhov began his senior career at Levski Sofia in the end of 1959–60 season at the age of 17. He made his debut on 5 June 1960 in a 1–0 home loss against Lokomotiv Sofia, coming on as a second-half substitute. His first senior goal came during the following campaign when he scored in a 1–1 away draw against Botev Plovdiv on 28 September 1960.

Botev Plovdiv
In January 1962, Asparuhov joined Botev Plovdiv where he won 1961–62 Bulgarian Cup a few months later. On 13 September 1962, he marked his European debut away at Steaua București with two goals, but Botev lost the game 3–2 in their preliminary round first leg tie of 1962–63 Cup Winners' Cup. A week later, in the second leg of Botev's European tie against Steaua, Asparuhov scored his first-ever hat-trick in a resounding 5–1 home victory. He also scored in a 4–0 away win over Shamrock Rovers on 24 October 1962 and became a top scorer of the tournament with 6 goals.

In October 1963, Asparuhov returned to Levski Sofia.

Return to Levski
Widely regarded as Levski's greatest ever player, Asparuhov played over 230 games for the club, winning three Bulgarian League titles and three Bulgarian Cups. During his time at the club he won the Bulgarian footballer of the year and Bulgarian sportsperson of the year in 1965.

Asparuhov is Levski's third all-time leading goal scorer (153). In 1964–65 season he became the league's top scorer with 27 goals in 29 matches.

Some of the top European clubs at the time sought his services. In the 1965–66 European Cup, Levski played Benfica, with Eusébio in the squad of the Portuguese. When Benfica eliminated Levski in a tight tie, and Gundi having netted 3 of Levski's 4 goals across both legs, Europe began to view him with interest. In fact, he was the first foreign player to have scored two goals at Benfica's stadium. Asparuhov was wanted by Benfica themselves, as well as Italian giants AC Milan. Regarding the latter's offer, Gundi answered that way:

"Tell them there is a country named Bulgaria. In that country there is a team called Levski, they might not have heard of it. But I was born in this team and I will die there."

International career
He made his World Cup debut in the second group game against Hungary at Estadio Braden Copper Co. in Rancagua on 3 June 1962.

Asparuhov scored his first goals for Bulgaria on 7 November 1962, scoring twice in a 3–1 home victory over Portugal in a 1964 European Nations' Cup qualifying match. Then he top scored for Bulgaria in their 1966 World Cup qualifying campaign with five goals. During the World Cup he scored Bulgaria's only goal in a 1–3 loss against Hungary at Old Trafford in Manchester.

Death
Asparuhov died in a car crash in 1971 with teammate Nikola Kotkov. Over 550,000 people gathered at his funeral in Sofia. The stadium of Levski Sofia is named Georgi Asparuhov Stadium in honour of the famous striker.

Career statistics

Club

National team

International goals
Scores and results list Bulgaria's goal tally first.

Honours

Club
Botev Plovdiv
Bulgarian Cup: 1961–62

Levski Sofia
 Bulgarian League (3): 1964–65, 1967–68, 1969–70
 Bulgarian Cup (3): 1966–67, 1969–70, 1970–71

Individual
 Bulgarian League top scorer: 1964–65 (27 goals)
 UEFA Cup Winners' Cup top scorer: 1962–63 (6 goals)
 Bulgarian sportsperson of the year: 1965
 Bulgarian footballer of the year: 1965
 Best Bulgarian footballer of the 20th century
 1965 Ballon d'Or: 8th place
 Holder of an Order of Labour
 Deserved Master of Sports
 Holder of the Fairplay prize /posthumously/: 1999
 IFFHS Top 100 Best European Players of the 20th Century: 40th place

International
Bulgaria
 UEFA Euro 1968: 5th place

References

External links

 
 
 Player Profile at levskisofia.info

1943 births
1971 deaths
Bulgarian footballers
Bulgaria international footballers
First Professional Football League (Bulgaria) players
PFC Levski Sofia players
Botev Plovdiv players
1962 FIFA World Cup players
1966 FIFA World Cup players
1970 FIFA World Cup players
20th-century Bulgarian people
Footballers from Sofia
Road incident deaths in Bulgaria
Burials at Central Sofia Cemetery
Association football forwards